The Matthew R. Bentley House is a historic house in Red Cloud, Nebraska. It was built in 1883 by J. Brubaker, a carpenter. Author Willa Cather took inspiration from the house for her 1915 novel, The Song of the Lark, in which she describes Duke Block. The house was designed in the Gothic Revival architectural style. It has been listed on the National Register of Historic Places since August 11, 1982.

References

	
National Register of Historic Places in Webster County, Nebraska
Gothic Revival architecture in Nebraska